Samantha Robinson may refer to:

 Samantha Robinson (English actress) (born 1981)
 Samantha Robinson (American actress) (born 1991)